The New York Times Presents (previously The Weekly) is an American narrative investigative journalism docuseries produced by The New York Times for FX and Hulu.

The program has aired in two distinct formats. The first format, The Weekly, was a television spin-off of the daily news podcast, The Daily, that covered recent topical news and cultural stories with the involvement of Times journalists in a half-hour timeslot, and premiered on FX on June 2, 2019. Thirty episodes were ordered for the first season.

On May 26, 2020, the series was renewed for a second season, reformatted as a series of longer documentaries, released approximately monthly, under the new blanket title The New York Times Presents. A third production season, its second season under the NYT Presents title, began airing on May 20, 2022. These documentaries are also distributed internationally under the title The Weekly: Special Edition.

Broadcast 
Each episode of The Weekly streamed exclusively on Hulu a day after its FX premiere. Each episode was made available to New York Times subscribers in the U.S. five weeks after streaming on Hulu. Following the reformatting as The New York Times Presents, new editions are now released on Hulu simultaneously with their FX airings.

Outside the United States, the series is distributed by Red Arrow Studios, parent company of series co-producer Left/Right Productions, and does not usually air on FX's international offshoots.

Episodes

The Weekly

The New York Times Presents

Season 1 (2020–2021)

Season 2 (2022)

Reception

Critical response 
On Metacritic, the series has an overall score of 77 out of 100, based on 5 reviews, indicating "generally favorable reviews." On Rotten Tomatoes, the first season has an approval rating of 84% with an average rating of 6.50/10 based on 51 reviews.

Accolades

References

External links 
 
 The New York Times Presents on FX
 
 
 The Weekly on FX
 

2010s American documentary television series
2019 American television series debuts
English-language television shows
FX Networks original programming
Hulu original programming
The New York Times
Television series about journalism